The Ven. William Methven Gordon Ducat (17 March 1847 – 17 March 1922) was the Archdeacon of Berkshire from 1903 until his death.

Ducat was born in Edinburgh and educated at Edinburgh Academy and Balliol College, Oxford and ordained in 1873.

Ducat began his ordained ministry as a curate of All Souls, Langham Place after which he was the chaplain of Cuddesdon College. He was the rector of Lamplugh from 1877 to 1880 when he became the principal of Leeds Clergy School. He returned to Cuddesdon in 1883 where he remained until 1894 when he became the vicar of St Giles's Reading, a position he held until 1911.

References

1847 births
People educated at Edinburgh Academy
Alumni of Balliol College, Oxford
Archdeacons of Berkshire
1922 deaths